Cingia de' Botti is a comune (municipality) in the Province of Cremona in the Italian region Lombardy, located about  southeast of Milan and about  southeast of Cremona.

Cingia de' Botti borders the following municipalities: Ca' d'Andrea, Cella Dati, Derovere, Motta Baluffi, San Martino del Lago, Scandolara Ravara.

In a 2005 ruling of the European Court of Justice, the comune's award of a concession contract for public gas distribution services was criticised, as the contract had been awarded to a company called Padania without a competitive procurement process, contrary to EU regulations. Padania was a public-sector company owned by the Province of Cremona and most of the comunes within the province, including Cingia de’ Botti, but also open, at least to some degree, to private part-ownership.

References

Cities and towns in Lombardy